Visakha Govt. Degree College For Women is a Women's college established in 1975 by the Visakha Women's College Society.

Institution
This college is NAAC B grade Science and Commerce courses Graduation & post graduation courses are offered here.

References

External links
http://www.vgdcw.in

Universities and colleges in Visakhapatnam
Colleges in Andhra Pradesh
Colleges affiliated to Andhra University
Educational institutions established in 1975
Women's universities and colleges in Andhra Pradesh
1975 establishments in Andhra Pradesh